Moy may refer to:

Places
 Loch Moy, a loch south of Inverness in the Highlands of Scotland
 Moy, Highland, a village beside Loch Moy
 Moy Hall, also near the loch and the ancestral home of the chiefs of Clan Mackintosh
 Rout of Moy, an event in the Jacobite rising of 1745
 Glen Moy, a glen in Glen Clova, north of Forfar, Scotland
 A raspberry, cultivar named after this glen
 Moy, a hamlet, hunting lodge and forest west of Loch Laggan, Highland, Scotland
 Moy Castle, ancestral home of the Clan Maclaine of Lochbuie in Scotland
 Moy, County Tyrone, a village in Northern Ireland
 River Moy, a river which runs through County Sligo and County Mayo in Ireland
 Moÿ-de-l'Aisne, a comune in northern France
 Moy House (disambiguation)

People
 Moy (surname), a list of people so named
 Mei (surname), a Chinese surname which can be transliterated as Moy, including a list of people
 Mooy Lambert (died 1625), Dutch vice admiral
 Moy (surname), Moisses Salvador Rodriguez

Other uses
 Moy (salt) – A measure for salt used in colonial British North America
 HMS Moy (1904), a Royal Navy destroyer launched in 1905
 Moy (ship), an iron sailing ship launched in 1885
 Moy Racing, a defunct NASCAR auto racing team
 "Moy", a series of virtual pet games by Frojo Apps

See also
 Moi (disambiguation)
 Mooy (disambiguation)
 Moye (disambiguation)